The Nahr al-Kabir, also known in Syria as al-Nahr al-Kabir al-Janoubi (by contrast with the Nahr al-Kabir al-Shamali) or in Lebanon simply as the Kebir, is a river in Syria and Lebanon flowing into the Mediterranean Sea at Arida. Its headwaters are at the Ain as-Safa spring in Lebanon and it flows through the Homs Gap.

The river forms the northern part of the Lebanon–Syria border. In antiquity, the river was known as Eleutherus (Greek Ελεύθερος Eleutheros, Ελευθερίς Eleuteris lit. 'free'). It defined the border between the Seleucid and Ptolemaic empires during much of the 3rd century BCE.

The river is mentioned by Josephus and in 1 Maccabees 11:7 and 12:30.

References

Rivers of Lebanon
Rivers of Syria
International rivers of Asia
Lebanon–Syria border